Hanover Insurance Park at Fitton Field is a baseball stadium in Worcester, Massachusetts. Primarily used for College of the Holy Cross sporting events, the baseball stadium also served as the home field for the Can-Am League Worcester Tornadoes, and the current home of the Futures Collegiate Baseball League Worcester Bravehearts. The stadium is named after the Reverend James Fitton, who donated land to the Archdiocese of Boston to found the college.

The baseball stadium lacks any outfield bleachers due to the proximity of Interstate 290 and the Fitton Field football stadium. Fitton Field hosted the MIAA High School Baseball State Finals in 2012 and has hosted them each year since 2014. During football season, the baseball field is used for parking and tailgating.

History 
Though Holy Cross had fielded varsity baseball and football teams for several years by the end of the 19th century, the teams lacked an on-campus stadium. They played their home games at the Worcester College Grounds, Worcester Driving Park Grounds and Worcester Oval.

In September 1903, the football team played the first intercollegiate game on the site of today's Hanover Insurance Park, then known simply as Holy Cross Field. Holy Cross beat Massachusetts Agricultural College – now UMass Amherst – by 6-0. 

The baseball team began playing at this facility in 1905, with their first game coinciding with the dedication of the facility as Fitton Field. Baseball and football continued to share the stadium until 1908, when a separate football stadium, also known as Fitton Field, was built beyond right-field.

The two adjacent stadiums were known by the same name until 2005, when the baseball field was renovated to accommodate the Worcester Tornadoes. The renamed Hanover Insurance Park featured upgraded seating and lighting, and a capacity of approximately 3,000 spectators.

Famous uses 
Lou Gehrig played a game at Fitton Field in 1922 as a sophomore for Columbia University. Babe Ruth played at Fitton Field for the Boston Braves in a 1935 exhibition game against Holy Cross. In a 1939 exhibition game between Holy Cross and the Boston Red Sox, Ted Williams hit his first home run in a Red Sox uniform. In 2006, Fitton Field hosted the 100 Inning Game benefit for Curt Schilling's charity, Curt's Pitch for ALS.

See also
 List of NCAA Division I baseball venues

References

External links

 
 
 

1903 establishments in Massachusetts
Baseball in Worcester, Massachusetts
Baseball venues in Massachusetts
College baseball venues in the United States
Futures Collegiate Baseball League ballparks
Holy Cross Crusaders baseball
Sports venues in Worcester, Massachusetts
Sports venues completed in 1903